Belloa wurdackiana is a species of plant in the family Asteraceae.

References

Gnaphalieae